Empire under Attack is a 12-episode 2000 Russian miniseries, about the confrontation of the Security Department and the SR Combat Organization at the beginning of the 20th century.

The series covers eight years of the history of the Russian Empire – from 1901 to 1908.

Plot
At the beginning of the 20th century, Moscow and St. Petersburg were shocked by the unprecedented cruelty of terrorists. A wave of loud political murders is rolling around the country. Combat organizations are preparing the collapse of the monarchy. The authorities are trying to maintain order in the country. The Imperial Security Office creates a special investigative team, which is charged with all means to prevent a future catastrophe.

Cast 

 Igor Livanov as Investigator of the Security Department of St. Petersburg titular counselor (in the 12th episode  collegiate counselor) Pavel Nesterovich Putilovsky
 Valentin Bukin as Evgrafi Petrovich Medyannikov
 Denis Zaitsev as Lieutenant baron Ivan Karlovich Berg, demolition engineer
 Tatiana Bedova as Leyda Karlovna
 Vladimir Bogdanov as Yevno Azef
 Aleksei Serebryakov as Boris Savinkov
 Yuri Galtsev as Alexander Iosifovich Frank
 Yuri Orlov as Yakov Grigorievich Sazonov, chief of the St. Petersburg security department
 Sergey Zuev as Alexey Vikentiev
 Olga Samoshina as cashier Maria Maksimovskaya
 Igor Dobryakov as Chief of the Police Department of Tuzlukov
 Konstantin Khabensky as SR terrorist Grigory Gershuni
 Alexey Zuev as journalist Andrei Yakovlevich Vershinin
 Olga Budina as Olga
 Ilze Liepa as ballerina Tamara Karsavina
 Yuliya Rutberg as Lyubov Azef
 Anna Banshchikova as the mistress of Azef Hannah Clayfer
 Lyudmila Kurepova as Nina Neklyudova
 Georgy Shtil as owner of the pharmacy Pevzner
 Andrei Zibrov as Ageev Vladimir Mikhailovich - Topaz
 Ivan I. Krasko as elder Kondraty
 Nikolai Yeremenko Jr. as Vyacheslav von Plehve
 Leonid Nevedomsky as Minister of Internal Affairs Dmitry Sipyagin
 Marina Aleksandrova as Maria Stolypina
 Alexander Anisimov as Yegor Sozonov
 Irina Apeksimova as Dora Brilliant
 Aleksandr Domogarov as Georgy Gapon
 Viktor Khozyainov as Chukhna
 Elena Kucherenko as Sokolovskaya Olympiad Georgievna
 Gennady Smirnov as Stepan Balmashov
 Alexander Stroyev as Kraft
 Nikita Tatarenkov as Ivan Kalyayev
 Tamara Urzhumova as Vanda Kazimirovna
 Alexander Karpukhov as Pisarenko
 Vladimir Sterzhakov as Doctor Dubovitsky
 Viktoriya Isakova as episode
 Ksenia Rappoport as Alina
 Valery Barinov as Rataev Leonid Aleksandrovich
 Andrey Fedortsov as Aleksei Pokotilov
 Andrey Astrakhantsev as retired lieutenant Alexander Baklanov
 Olga Sukhorukova as Tatyana Nechaeva
 Boris Plotnikov as Grand Duke Sergei Alexandrovich
 Yelena Safonova as Grand Duchess Elizaveta Fedorovna
 Yuri Mitrofanov as Moscow mayor Major-General Volkov
 Aleksandr Porokhovshchikov as Moscow Governor Vladimir Dzhunkovsky
 Nikolai Chindyajkin as vice-director of the Police Department Pyotr Rachkovsky
 Oleg Dmitriev as Alexey Cheremukhin
 Georgy Traugot as SR member Pinhas Rutenberg
 Alexey Fedkin as Maxim Gorky
 Yuri Tarasov as Solomon Ryss (Mortimer)
 Alexander Zhmakin as Mikhail Sokolov
 Nikita Eryshev as Nikolay Lubomudrov
 Marina Zasukhina as Miss Lisa (8th episode Kamikaze)
 Aleksandr Feklistov as Pyotr Stolypin
 Andrei Tolubeyev as Managing Director of Stolypin Sergei Valerianovich Muromtsev
 Ernst Romanov as Chief of the St. Petersburg Security Department Major-General Alexander Vasilievich Gerasimov
 Andrey Rudensky as Teacher of the English Gymnasium Pyotr Stoedzinsky

References

External links
 

2000 Russian television series debuts
2000 Russian television series endings
2000s Russian television series
Channel One Russia original programming
Russian drama television series
Russian political television series